Reelworld Film Festival, founded in 2001 by Tonya Williams, is held annually in Toronto, Ontario, Canada. The festival screens film and provides professional development for Canadian racially diverse and indigenous filmmakers and media artists.

History
Reelworld was founded by Tonya Williams, who noted the lack of opportunities for people of color to break into the film industry. The festival's mandate states that they showcase diverse work from Canada and abroad while bringing together assorted communities.

Reelworld has started a number of initiatives directed towards diverse artists. In 2020 Williams launched Access Reelworld, a casting database to help publicize and promote actors of colour.

Due to the COVID-19 pandemic in Canada, the 2020 festival was presented entirely online.

2021 ReelWorld Film Festival 
The 21st annual ReelWorld Film Festival was held from October 20 to 27, 2021 in Toronto.

Award winners

2022 ReelWorld Film Festival 
The 22nd annual ReelWorld Film Festival was held from October 11 to 17, 2022 in Toronto.

Award winners

References

Film festivals in Toronto
Short film festivals in Canada
Film festivals established in 2001